The following is a list of sports stadiums on Ireland. This includes stadiums in both Northern Ireland and the Republic of Ireland. They are ordered by their capacity. The capacity figures are permanent total capacity as authorised by the controlling body, including seating and any standing areas, and excluding any temporary seating. The minimum required capacity is 1,000.

Most stadiums are used for Gaelic games, association football, or rugby union.

Top 10 stadiums by capacity
The maps pictured below, exclude stadiums currently under construction or awaiting redevelopment.

Stadiums
In italics are those currently under redevelopment/construction/planning. This list is not complete. Up to date as of 13 February 2022.

See also
 List of Gaelic Athletic Association stadiums
 List of Republic of Ireland association football stadiums
 Sport in Ireland
 List
 In Britain
 In England
 In Wales
 In Europe

References

 
Ireland
Ireland
Northern Ireland sport-related lists